Micromerys is a genus of South Pacific cellar spiders that was first described by H. B. Bradley in 1877.

Species
 it contains nine species, found only in Australia and Papua New Guinea:
Micromerys baiteta Huber, 2011 – New Guinea
Micromerys daviesae Deeleman-Reinhold, 1986 – Australia (Queensland)
Micromerys gidil Huber, 2001 – Australia (Queensland)
Micromerys gracilis Bradley, 1877 (type) – Australia (Northern Territory, Queensland)
Micromerys gurran Huber, 2001 – Australia (Queensland)
Micromerys papua Huber, 2011 – New Guinea
Micromerys raveni Huber, 2001 – Australia (Queensland, New South Wales)
Micromerys wigi Huber, 2001 – Australia (Queensland)
Micromerys yidin Huber, 2001 – Australia (Queensland)

See also
 List of Pholcidae species

References

Araneomorphae genera
Pholcidae
Spiders of Asia
Spiders of Australia